Coney Lake is a small alpine lake located in the Alpine Lakes Wilderness in King County, Washington. Coney Lake sits in a bowl formed by a rocky double cliff bifurcation of the south ridge of Lennox Mountain that connects to Coney's Cones-South Peak. Coney Lake is the origin of Coney Creek, which is a tributary of the west fork of Miller River. Lake Kanim is situated over the opposite side of the ridge as Lennox Mountain splits towards Canoe Peak. 

Coney Creek exits down over 1000 feet to a cirque making a waterfall that hugs a crevice along the cliff face of the south skirt of Lennox Mountain.

See also 
 List of lakes of the Alpine Lakes Wilderness

References 

Lakes of King County, Washington
Lakes of the Alpine Lakes Wilderness
Okanogan National Forest